Milea may refer to several villages in Greece:

 Milea, in Aetolia-Acarnania, part of the municipal unit Inachos
 Milea, in Aetolia-Acarnania, part of the municipal unit Pyllini
 Milea, in Arcadia, part of the municipal unit Mantineia
 Milea, in Arta regional unit, part of the municipal unit Agnanta
 Milea, in Arta regional unit, part of the municipal unit Tetrafylia
 Milea, Evros, in Evros regional unit, part of the municipal unit Trigono
 Milea, in Evrytania, part of the municipality Karpenisi
 Milea, Grevena, in Grevena regional unit, part of the municipal unit Irakleotes
 Milea, Ioannina, a community in Ioannina regional unit
 Milea, Larissa, in Larissa regional unit, part of the municipal unit Sarantaporo
 Milea, Messenia, in Messenia, part of the municipal unit Lefktro
 Milea, Pella, in Pella regional unit, part of the municipal unit Exaplatanos
 Milea, Phocis, in Phocis, part of the municipal unit Tolofon
 Milea, Thesprotia, in Thesprotia, part of the municipal unit Filiates
 Milea, in Trikala regional unit, part of the municipal unit Aspropotamos

Other uses 
 Milea: Suara dari Dilan,  2020 Indonesian film directed by Fajar Bustomi and Pidi Baiq, based on the novel of the same name by Baiq

See also 
 Milea River (disambiguation)